Edward Bernard Fort is an American educator, who served as the 8th Chancellor of North Carolina Agricultural and Technical State University from 1981 to 1999. He is now Chancellor Emeritus and Professor of Leadership Studies.

Early life and education
Fort, born in Detroit, Michigan, earned a bachelor’s degree in history and a master’s degree in educational administration from Wayne State University. He later received his doctorate in educational administration from the University of California, Berkeley in 1964.

Early career
Fort's career in education began in 1964, when he worked as a curriculum coordinator for the Detroit Public School system. During this time he also taught as a visiting professor at the University of Michigan. Fort would later go on to serve as an adjunct professor of urban education at the University of Michigan-Dearborn, in 1968 and a visiting professor at Michigan State University in 1974. From there Fort became superintendent of the now defunct Inkster Michigan Public School System, and Sacramento City Unified School District in 1967 and 1971 respectively. From 1974 to 1981, Fort served as chancellor of the University of Wisconsin Colleges, a unit of the University of Wisconsin System comprising 14 two-year colleges.

North Carolina Agricultural and Technical State University
On September 1, 1981, Fort assumed the responsibilities of chancellor of North Carolina A&T State University. He would later be inaugurated as the university's eighth chancellor on April 24, 1982. Under Fort's leadership, North Carolina A&T established itself on the national level as a leader in engineering and technology education. During the Fort administration, the university initiated more than 30 new academic programs and awarded its first doctoral degrees in mechanical and electrical engineering. In addition, the university experienced substantial growth as more than $50 million in new construction was completed; including a new building for the College of Engineering and a new Library, as well as nearly $30 million in campus renovations. The university also experienced an increase in enrollment in both domestic and international students. On June 30, 1999, Fort retired as chancellor of the university, and currently serves as a professor of Leadership Studies (Endowed), Chancellor Emeritus and Special Assistant to the Chancellor .

Personal life and legacy
Dr. Fort is married to his wife Lessie Covington (deceased); the two have two children together. The Edward B. Fort Interdisciplinary Research Center (IRC) on the campus of North Carolina A&T was named in his honor in March 1999.

References

1951 births
Living people
North Carolina A&T State University leaders
North Carolina A&T State University faculty
African-American academics
Wayne State University alumni
University of California, Berkeley alumni
People from Detroit
21st-century African-American people
20th-century African-American people